Zhongfang Town is a town and the county seat of Zhongfang County in Hunan, China. The town is located in the southwest of the county. It was reformed to merge with Luting'ao Township, Pailou Town and the former Zhongfang Town on November 24, 2015. Its seat of local government is at Longjing Village.

References

Zhongfang County
County seats in Hunan